Robert Edward Hawks (August 1, 1926 – January 31, 2004) was an American politician in the state of Tennessee.

Life and career
Robert Edward Hawks was born in Memphis, Tennessee on August 1, 1926. He served in the Tennessee House of Representatives from 1967 to 1972. A Democrat, he represented Shelby County, Tennessee (District 16) and owned a moving company, Bob Hawks Movers, Inc..

Hawks died in Memphis on January 31, 2004, at the age of 77.

References

1926 births
2004 deaths
Members of the Tennessee House of Representatives